Alberto Vitoria Soria (11 January 1956 – 26 April 2010) was a Spanish professional footballer who played as a midfielder.

Club career
Vitoria was born in Ágreda, Province of Soria, Castile and León, being the sixth of seven children. He spent nine years with Real Madrid all categories comprised, playing five seasons with the first team; he made his La Liga debut on 7 September 1974 at the age of 18, playing 52 minutes in a 2–1 away win against Valencia CF.

Vitoria received little playing time, however, during his senior spell at the Santiago Bernabéu Stadium, his best output being 20 games and one goal in the 1976–77 campaign, precisely when the club did not win any major trophies. On 27 February 1977 he became the first player from his native region to score in the top division, in a 4–2 home victory over Real Zaragoza.

Leaving Real Madrid in summer 1979 after appearing in 88 competitive matches, Vitoria signed for Burgos CF, being relegated from the top flight in his first year. He then spent three seasons with Granada CF (two in Segunda División B, one in Segunda División), retiring in June 1985 at the age of 29 with Rayo Vallecano, which he helped promote to the second level.

International career
Vitoria represented Spain at the 1976 Summer Olympics in Montreal, appearing in two group stage losses (the only games the national team played in the tournament after Nigeria withdrew).

Death
Vitoria died on 26 April 2010 in Zaragoza, Aragon, due to heart failure. He was 54 years old.

Honours
Real Madrid
La Liga: 1974–75, 1975–76, 1977–78, 1978–79
Copa del Rey: 1974–75

References

External links

1956 births
2010 deaths
Sportspeople from the Province of Soria
Spanish footballers
Footballers from Castile and León
Association football midfielders
La Liga players
Segunda División players
Segunda División B players
Tercera División players
Real Madrid Castilla footballers
Real Madrid CF players
Burgos CF (1936) footballers
Granada CF footballers
Rayo Vallecano players
Spain youth international footballers
Spain under-21 international footballers
Spain amateur international footballers
Olympic footballers of Spain
Footballers at the 1976 Summer Olympics